Eleven Media Group was founded in 2000 by Than Htut Aung in Yangon, Myanmar. It has five weekly publications in Burmese specializing in news and sports. Reporters without Borders awarded the "Media of the Year" 2011 for its long standing against the military government. It employs 250 staff and combined circulation is 450,000 copies in 2012. It has a comprehensive agreement with Nation Multimedia Group Plc of Thailand in May 2012.

See also
 Weekly Eleven

References

External links
 Official website

Companies of Myanmar
Mass media companies established in 2000